Jeff Zentner is an American lawyer and author of young adult novels.

Biography 
Zenter works full-time as a lawyer.

Before focusing on writing, Zentner worked as a singer-songwriter, releasing three albums as a solo artist and two with a band. Additionally, he has recorded music with Nick Cave, Debbie Harry, and Iggy Pop. In his mid-30s, he turned his creative efforts toward creative writing.

Zentner presently lives in Nashville, Tennessee.

Awards and honors 
Publishers Weekly named Zentner a PW Flying Start in 2016.

The Serpent King received starred reviews from Kirkus Reviews, Publishers Weekly, and Shelf Awareness. Hudson Booksellers, Publishers Weekly, and Shelf Awareness named it one of the best teen novels of 2016. Goodbye Days received a starred review from Publishers Weekly and Shelf Awareness. The Southern Independent Booksellers Alliance included Rayne & Delilah's Midnite Matinee on their 2019 Winter Okra Picks. The book received starred reviews from Booklist and Publishers Weekly. In the Wild Light received starred reviews from Booklist, Kirkus Reviews, Publishers Weekly, and School Library Journal. Publishers Weekly named it one of the top ten young adult novels of 2021.

Publications 

 The Serpent King (2016)
 Goodbye Days (2017)
 Rayne & Delilah's Midnite Matinee (2019)
 In the Wild Light (2021)

References

External links 

 Official website

21st-century American writers
Writers from Nashville, Tennessee